The list of World Rallycross Championship events includes all World Championship rallycross events that have been part of the World Rallycross Championship schedule since the series' inception in 2014.

Active and past events

By event
''Information below is correct up to and including the 2022 World RX of Germany.

Timeline

Events by season

2014–2023

Notes

World Rallycross Championship

World RX